Travelers Rest is a city in Greenville County, South Carolina, United States. The population was 4,576 at the 2010 census, a small increase from 4,099 in 2000. By 2018 the population had jumped to 5,253. It is part of the Greenville–Mauldin–Easley Metropolitan Statistical Area. Travelers Rest, the northernmost city in Greenville County,  is located 10 miles north of Greenville and around 20 miles south of the North Carolina border. Furman University, a private liberal-arts university, was annexed into the city limits of Travelers Rest in April of 2018 and North Greenville University, a private Christian institution, is located in nearby Tigerville, SC.

History
In 1794, the South Carolina General Assembly appropriated $2,000 to construct a wagon road from Greenville, SC, north into the Blue Ridge Mountains, through Asheville, North Carolina, ending in East Tennessee. This road, once fully completed in the mid-1850's, was full of wagon traffic. For those going north into the mountains from the coast through Greenville, Travelers Rest was the first well equipped stop to prepare for the several thousand foot climb ahead of them. Travelers Rest was most recently incorporated as a city in 1959, although there was an 1891 incorporation that expired. While unincorporated, most of the area was known as Bates Township during the 19th and early 20th centuries.

The John H. Goodwin House and George Salmon House are listed on the National Register of Historic Places. American Revolutionary heroine Dicey Langston's home, now site of a historical marker, is located just north of the city proper.

Transportation 
U.S. Route 276-N enters connects Downtown Greenville with the city and becomes Travelers Rest's Main Street before heading northwest past Caesar's Head State Park, and into North Carolina to Brevard, NC. U.S. Route 25-N, enters the city from West Greenville, then turns north into the Blue Ridge Mountains, connecting to Asheville, NC, 54 miles away.

Climate

Demographics

2020 census

As of the 2020 United States census, there were 7,788 people, 1,751 households, and 1,171 families residing in the city.

2000 census

As of the census of 2000, there were 4,099 people, 1,563 households, and 1,137 families residing in the city. The population density was 930.8 people per square mile (359.7/km2). There were 1,729 housing units at an average density of 392.6 per square mile (151.7/km2). The racial makeup of the city was 77.36% White, 18.30% African American, 0.27% Native American, 1.22% Asian, 1.68% from other races, and 1.17% from two or more races. 4.22% of the population were of Hispanic or Latino ethnicity.

There were 1,563 households, out of which 38.0% had children under the age of 18 living with them, 49.6% were married couples living together, 18.6% had a female householder with no husband present, and 27.2% were non-families. 22.5% of all households were made up of individuals, and 8.8% had someone living alone who was 65 years of age or older. The average household size was 2.60 and the average family size was 3.04.

In the city, the population was spread out, with 29.9% under the age of 18, 9.6% from 18 to 24, 29.4% from 25 to 44, 20.3% from 45 to 64, and 10.7% who were 65 years of age or older. The median age was 32 years. For every 100 females, there were 93.1 males. For every 100 females age 18 and over, there were 86.7 males.

The median income for a household in the city was $34,917, and the median income for a family was $38,229. Males had a median income of $30,377 versus $22,634 for females. The per capita income for the city was $15,704. About 12.2% of families and 15.8% of the population were below the poverty line, including 23.9% of those under age 18 and 11.8% of those age 65 or over.

Education
Furman University is south of Travelers Rest with Greenville as the designated address. The city is also the home of the Travelers Rest High School Devildogs.

Travelers Rest has a public library, a branch of the Greenville County Library System.

References

External links
 City of Travelers Rest official website
 TravelersRestHere.com - Destination Information for Visitors
 Greater Travelers Rest Chamber of Commerce
 Travelers Rest Tribune
 ExploreTR

Cities in South Carolina
Cities in Greenville County, South Carolina
Upstate South Carolina